Jean Chamant (23 November 1913 – 22 December 2010) was a French politician, judge and senator who served from 1977 to 1995.

Career 
Chamant graduated from the Ecole Saint-Jacques and Faculté de droit de Paris with a degree in law and began his career as a lawyer in 1937. Chamant assumed the title of judge in 1977.

Death 
Chamant died in Paris on 22 December 2010 at the age of 97.

References 

1913 births
2010 deaths
People from Saône-et-Loire
Politicians from Bourgogne-Franche-Comté
National Centre of Independents and Peasants politicians
Independent Republicans politicians
Rally for the Republic politicians
Transport ministers of France
Deputies of the 1st National Assembly of the French Fourth Republic
Deputies of the 2nd National Assembly of the French Fourth Republic
Deputies of the 3rd National Assembly of the French Fourth Republic
Deputies of the 1st National Assembly of the French Fifth Republic
Deputies of the 2nd National Assembly of the French Fifth Republic
Deputies of the 3rd National Assembly of the French Fifth Republic
Deputies of the 4th National Assembly of the French Fifth Republic
Deputies of the 5th National Assembly of the French Fifth Republic
French Senators of the Fifth Republic
Senators of Yonne
20th-century French judges